Moratuwage Sanjaya Devapriya Fernando (born 25 December 1988) is a Sri Lankan cricketer. He made his first-class debut for Moratuwa Sports Club in the 2008–09 Premier Trophy on 14 November 2008.

See also
 List of Chilaw Marians Cricket Club players

References

External links
 

1988 births
Living people
Sri Lankan cricketers
Chilaw Marians Cricket Club cricketers
Moors Sports Club cricketers
Moratuwa Sports Club cricketers
Ragama Cricket Club cricketers
Sinhalese Sports Club cricketers
Sri Lanka Ports Authority Cricket Club cricketers
Cricketers from Colombo